MC Solaar, the self-titled fourth album (released July 1998) by French-Senegalese rapper, MC Solaar was a shorter effort than his previous releases. Following the funk-grooved sounds of Paradisiaque, the production style once again changed, to essentially an album of two halves. The first half was reminiscent of his previous effort, with Boom Bass and Phillip Zdar producing the tracks, while the latter half shifting to a grittier, east coast U.S. hip-hop sound. Some of these tracks were produced by the Beatminerz, known for his work with the BootCamp Clik. While different from what fans were used to, Solaar appeared to have no trouble following this new sound.

Track listing
 "Onzième Commandement" – 3:21
 "Galaktika" – 3:09
 "La 5ème Saison" – 3:57
 "Perfect" – 3:43
 "Les Songes" – 1:22
 "Vie N'Est Qu'un Moment" – 4:00
 "Vigipirap" – 3:30
 "Message de l'Ange" – 4:27
 "Nouvelle Genèse" – 3:27
 "Je Me Souviens (Flash-Back)" – 3:36
 "L'Argent Ne Fait Pas le Bonheur" – 2:57

1998 albums
MC Solaar albums